Diphenpipenol is an opioid analgesic drug invented in the 1970s by Dainippon Pharmaceutical Co. It is chemically a 1-substituted-4-(1,2-diphenylethyl)piperazine derivative related to compounds such as MT-45 and AD-1211, but diphenpipenol is the most potent compound in the series, with the more active (S) enantiomer being around 105 times the potency of morphine in animal studies. This makes it a similar strength to fentanyl and its analogues, and consequently diphenpipenol can be expected to pose a significant risk of producing life-threatening respiratory depression, as well as other typical opioid side effects such as sedation, itching, nausea and vomiting.

Diphenpipenol has been offered for sale online as a designer drug, though analysis of a sample of supposed diphenpipenol found it to instead contain a structural isomer with much weaker opioid activity, and it is unclear if genuine diphenpipenol has actually been sold.

See also 
 3C-PEP
 Azaprocin
 Bucinnazine
 Diphenidine
 Lefetamine

References 

Synthetic opioids
Diphenylethylpiperazines
Mu-opioid receptor agonists
Designer drugs